Bombur is an extinct genus of prawn in the order Decapoda known from the Jurassic of North America and Triassic of Europe. It was described in 1839 by Georg zu Münster, and named after the dwarf Bombur of Norse mythology.

References

Penaeidae
Triassic crustaceans
Jurassic crustaceans
Prehistoric crustacean genera